M. V. Raghu is an Indian film cinematographer turned director, screenwriter, and producer known for his works predominantly in Telugu cinema. In 1988, he has directed the neo-realistic film Kallu, which has received many awards including state awards and has garnered special mention from the CBFC Jury. Jury Member for Nandi Film Awards 2001 and 2017. Also Known As "Kallu Raghu" in Telugu Film Industry

Education
After completing B.Sc. degree from SRR & CVR Govt. Degree College, Vijayawada.
He Joined Govt. College Of Fine Arts and Graduated in Diploma in Photography

Career
He assisted for many films in Vijaya- Vauhini Studios, Chennai in 1975.
During that period as Camera Assistant And  Focus Assistant, He worked for several cinematographers.
He assisted to Marcus Bartley( DOP Maya Bazar), P.L.Rai ( Lavakusa fame), M.A.Rehman, G.K Ramu, Maruthi Rao, P.S.Sevaraj Babu Bhai Mistry, Ravikanth Nagaich, Malli Irani, K.S.Prasad, A.Vincent, P.N.Sundatam, Ramachandra Babu,
Ashok Kumar, Balu Mahendra...etc.

Filmography
Cinematography

Director

Screenplay

Short films

Documentary films

Television works

As film Academician

Awards

As OPERATIVE CAMERAMAN

As ASSISTANT CAMERAMAN

References 

Nandi Award winners
Filmfare Awards South winners
Telugu film directors
Telugu film cinematographers
Living people
Cinematographers from Andhra Pradesh
Telugu screenwriters
Screenwriters from Andhra Pradesh
Telugu film producers
20th-century Indian film directors
20th-century Indian photographers
1954 births